Opar is a fictional lost city in the Tarzan novels of Edgar Rice Burroughs and later the Khokarsa novels of Philip José Farmer and Christopher Paul Carey, as well as various derivative works in other media.

The city first appeared in Burroughs' second Tarzan novel, The Return of Tarzan (1913).

In the works of Burroughs
As envisioned by Burroughs, Opar is a lost colony of Atlantis located deep in the jungles of Africa, in which incredible riches have been stockpiled down through the ages. The city's population exhibits extreme sexual dimorphism caused by a combination of excessive inbreeding, cross-breeding with apes, and selective culling of offspring. Consequently, female Oparians appear perfectly human, while male Oparians are apelike brutes. The ruler and high priestess of the city is Queen La, who on her first encounter with Tarzan falls in love with him, and subsequently carries a torch for him. Tarzan, already committed to Jane Porter, spurns her advances, thus endangering his own life, as the religion of Opar condones human sacrifice. Yet he returns to the lost city time and again to replenish his personal wealth from its hoarded treasure.

After its initial appearance in Burroughs's second Tarzan novel, The Return of Tarzan (1913), Opar is revisited in the fifth, Tarzan and the Jewels of Opar (1916); the ninth, Tarzan and the Golden Lion (1923); and the fourteenth, Tarzan the Invincible (1930). Exiles from Opar also appear in Burroughs' 1936 juvenile story "Tarzan and the Tarzan Twins, with Jad-Bal-Ja, the Golden Lion" (later published as the second part of Tarzan and the Tarzan Twins in 1963). The events of this story occur between those of the ninth and fourteenth Tarzan novels.

In the works of Farmer and Carey

Hints at the nature and origins of Opar appear in Philip José Farmer's fictional biography Tarzan Alive: A Definitive Biography of Lord Greystoke (1972). This book attempts to add a high degree of realism and plausibility to the Tarzan stories, including references to Opar. Farmer conjectures on the inhabitants of Opar, and even goes to suggest that the city's populace was on the verge of extinction at the time of the events in the original Tarzan novels. As Edgar Rice Burroughs made clear, there had been cross-breeding with the caveman-like "great ape" humanoids and the adoption of that animalistic language. Farmer continues the line of thinking, suggesting that a social desire for perfectly beautiful female babies and perfectly brutish male babies, perhaps coupled with infanticide, led to fatal decline of an already benighted city. The novel also relates events after the Tarzan books, including the ultimate fate of Opar. Tarzan himself returns to Opar, finds it empty or abandoned, tours the ruins, and (out of respect) decides to hide the city from modern curiosity by diverting a river to bury it in sediment.

Opar is also the eponymous setting of Farmer's novels Hadon of Ancient Opar (1974) and Flight to Opar (1976), which focus on the ancient history of the city some 10,000 years in the past. In Farmer's vision, the interior of Africa was then occupied by two huge linked inland seas, which were the cradle of a pre-Egyptian civilization called Khokarsa. This primeval empire was based on an island in the more northern sea, taken to be Atlantis in the Tarzan books; the city of Opar, located on the more southerly sea, is portrayed as having been a small backwater in the Khokarsan realm.

Farmer's novels mix in characters from the Tarzan series and H. Rider Haggard's Allan Quatermain series. Specifically, he strongly hints that the character Sahhindar—alias of the time traveler John Gribardsun from his novel Time's Last Gift—is in fact Tarzan himself, while the characters Lalia and Paga are his versions of Haggard's Laleela and Pag.

While Farmer wrote only two finished Opar novels, he originally planned to continue the series, and in fact left two incomplete Opar works: the novel The Song of Kwasin and novella "Kwasin and the Bear God". Both were later completed by Christopher Paul Carey (known best for his work on the Pathfinder Roleplaying Game), and later the novels were all compiled into the omnibus Gods of Opar.

Carey went on to write an original Opar novella, a prequel called Exiles of Kho (2012). This provided the groundwork for his own continuations of Farmer's Ancient Opar series, which include the novellas Hadon, King of Opar (2015) and Blood of Ancient Opar (2016).

In other media
On film, Opar was seen in the early Tarzan films The Adventures of Tarzan (1921), based on The Return of Tarzan; and Tarzan the Tiger (1929), based on Tarzan and the Jewels of Opar; as well as the film Tarzan and the Lost City (1998). Opar also appeared, in the guise of a generic African village, in Tarzan and the Lost Safari (1957), in which the Oparians were led by the male chief Chief Ogonooro (played by Orlando Martins) rather than the female queen/priestess La.

In the pre-title opening sequence for The Legend of Tarzan (2016), a fictionalized Léon Rom, portrayed by Christoph Waltz, led an expedition to secure the fabled diamonds of Opar to help finance the take-over of the African Congo for King Leopold II of Belgium. Rom's heavily-armed expedition was ambushed and massacred by native warriors, with only Rom himself surviving. Their tribal leader, Chief Mbonga (Djimon Hounsou), offered Rom the diamonds in exchange for Tarzan (Alexander Skarsgård). The film itself only mentioned Opar but did not actually show the lost city.

Opar has also appeared in some of the television series based on the Tarzan books. Most notably it appeared in the Disney TV adaptation, with La still ruling. However, the city's populace are humanoid leopards called the Leopard Men, who act as La's soldiers and servants. The Leopard Men are distantly based on the Leopard Society, a historical West African cult that Edgar Rice Burroughs had fictionalized in the non-Opar Tarzan novel Tarzan and the Leopard Men (1935). When La's sceptre is destroyed, the Leopard Men revert into their original leopard forms, La disintegrates into dust and Opar crumbles into oblivion. Even after the release of the Leopard Men, La's spirit possesses Jane and she (briefly) revives the city and creates statue warriors until Tarzan and a native African shaman interfere. Opar is again destroyed and La's ghost is condemned to be trapped inside a rat's body.

The City of Opar was mentioned in passing in the League of Extraordinary Gentlemen graphic novels.

The City of Opak-Re in the Planetary comic-book series is a pastiche of the City of Opar.

Notes

External links
 Opar by Rick Johnson, ERBzine No. 1547
 The Secret History of Opar by Den Valdron, ERBzine No. 1937
 The Return of Tarzan by Edgar Rice Burroughs (1913)
 Tarzan and the Jewels of Opar by Edgar Rice Burroughs (1916)
 Tarzan and the Golden Lion by Edgar Rice Burroughs (1922, 1923)
 Tarzan the Invincible by Edgar Rice Burroughs (1930, 1931)
 Khokarsa Series Checklist by the Christoper Paul Carey website
 

Fictional elements introduced in 1913
Edgar Rice Burroughs locations
Fictional African countries
Fictional populated places
Tarzan